The 2013 Lima Challenger was a professional tennis tournament played on clay courts. It was the seventh edition of the tournament which was part of the 2013 ATP Challenger Tour. It took place in Lima, Peru between 11 and 17 November 2013.

Singles main-draw entrants

Seeds

 1 Rankings are as of November 4, 2013.

Other entrants
The following players received wildcards into the singles main draw:
  Sergio Galdós
  Jorge Panta
  Rodrigo Sánchez
  Juan Pablo Varillas

The following players received entry from the qualifying draw:
  Pedro Cachín 
  Mauricio Echazú
  Sergio Monges
  Cristóbal Saavedra-Corvalán

Champions

Singles

 Horacio Zeballos def.  Facundo Bagnis 6–7(4–7), 6–3, 6–3

Doubles

 Andrés Molteni /  Fernando Romboli def.  Marcelo Demoliner /  Sergio Galdós 6–4, 6–4

External links
Official Website

Lima Challenger
Lima Challenger
Lima Challenger
Lima Challenger